Miller v. Alabama, 567 U.S. 460 (2012), was a United States Supreme Court case in which the Court held that mandatory sentences of life without the possibility of parole are unconstitutional for juvenile offenders. The ruling applied even to those persons who had committed murder as a juvenile, extending beyond Graham v. Florida (2010), which had ruled juvenile life without parole sentences unconstitutional for crimes excluding murder.

Background

The decision of the court was based on two consolidated cases, Jackson v. Hobbs, No. 10-9647, and Miller v. Alabama, No. 10-9646. The Los Angeles Times wrote: "In one case that came before the court, Kuntrell Jackson was 14 in November 18, 1999 when he and two other teenagers went to a video store in Arkansas planning to rob it. He stayed outside, and one of the youths pulled a gun and killed the store clerk. Jackson had waited outside the store for a time, but entered shortly before Derrick Shields shot the store clerk. There is debate as to whether he told the clerk, "We ain't playin or whether he said to his accomplices, "I thought you all was playin'." Jackson was not the shooter. Jackson was charged as an adult and given a life term with no parole.

In the second case, Evan Miller, a 14-year-old from Alabama, was convicted of a July 15, 2003 murder after he and another boy set fire to a trailer where they had bought drugs from a neighbor. Miller committed homicide in the act of robbing his neighbor, Cole Cannon. Cannon had fallen asleep after he, Miller, and Miller's friend Colby Smith had indulged in alcohol and marijuana. Cannon awoke as Miller was replacing Cannon's wallet, and Smith hit Cannon with a baseball bat. Miller took up the bat and proceeded to severely beat Cannon. Smith and Miller later returned to destroy the evidence of what they had done by setting fire to Cannon's trailer. Cannon died of severe injuries and smoke inhalation. On October 20, 2006, Miller was given a life term with no parole, while Smith received life with parole on October 27, 2006.

Opinion of the Court

Majority opinion
Justice Elena Kagan wrote for the majority of the court "that mandatory life without parole for those under age of 18 at the time of their crime violates the 8th Amendment’s prohibition on cruel and unusual punishments". Justice Kagan said:

Dissents
Chief Justice John Roberts voiced in his dissent the opinion that mandatory life sentences "could not plausibly be described" as unusual when a majority of states endorse them. He wrote: "Determining the appropriate sentence for a teenager convicted of murder presents grave and challenging questions of morality and social policy. Our role, however, is to apply the law, not to answer such questions." A separate dissent was filed by Justice Samuel Alito. Alito wrote of the consequences of the majority ruling:

The holding of the court applies retroactively to all those convicted of crimes committed under 18. It does not automatically free any prisoner, and it does not forbid sentences of life terms for young murderers. Instead judges in their review have to consider the defendant's youth, mitigating factors, and the nature of the crime before sentencing the defendant to imprisonment with no hope for parole.

The case was remanded to the trial court for the convicted youths to be re-sentenced.

Retroactivity
In Montgomery v. Louisiana (2016), the Supreme Court determined that Miller v. Alabama must be applied retroactively. The petitioner, Henry Montgomery, has been in prison since 1963 for a murder he committed at the age of 17. The Court said that states could undertake re-sentencing, or offer parole to inmates sentenced to life as minors. Up to 2,300 cases nationwide were estimated to be affected by the ruling.

Another case affected by the ruling would be the sentence that Lee Boyd Malvo received for his role in the D.C. sniper attacks, with a judge making a ruling similar to Montgomery v. Louisiana. Malvo's trial progress had earlier been affected by Roper v. Simmons, which took the death penalty out of play for Malvo, who had been charged with capital murder. The Supreme Court had granted the case Mathena v. Malvo in March 2019, and heard oral argument in October 2019. However, a change in Virginia law rendered the case moot.

A year later, the Supreme Court granted a related case, Jones v. Mississippi, involving a person who had killed his grandfather when he was 15 in 2004 and given the mandatory sentence of life without parole. Due to the reactive rulings in Miller and Montgomery, Jones was given a rehearing but was still resentenced to life in prison, and appealed, claiming the court did not evaluate any aspect of his incorrigibility as required under Montgomery. Oral hearings were held on November 3, 2020. On April 22, 2021, the US Supreme Court affirmed the judgment of the Mississippi Court of Appeals.

Kuntrell Jackson was released from prison on February 21, 2017.

Subsequent developments 
Miller was given a resentencing hearing in 2017, however it was not until April 2021 that a verdict had been reached with him being resentenced to life without parole.  Miller is now trying to appeal his resentencing verdict.

References

External links

 

 

United States Supreme Court cases
United States Supreme Court cases of the Roberts Court
Cruel and Unusual Punishment Clause case law
United States children's rights case law
2012 in United States case law